Albert David Baumhart Jr. (June 15, 1908 – January 23, 2001) was a Republican member of the U.S. House of Representatives from Ohio. He served in Congress from 1941 to 1942, and again from 1955 to 1961.

Early life 
Baumhart was born in Vermilion, Ohio. He attended Ohio University in Athens, Ohio, receiving his A.B. and M.A. in 1931.

Political career 
He was a publishing house representative at Vermilion, Ohio, from 1932 to 1939. He was a member of the Ohio State Senate from 1937 to 1940.

Baumhart was elected as a Republican to the Seventy-seventh Congress.  Throughout all of 1940 and most of 1941 he was known as an "interventionist Republican" who advocated that America go to war in Europe against Nazi Germany in order to help the United Kingdom. He resigned to accept a commission in the United States Navy on September 2, 1942. He was discharged as a lieutenant commander on January 17, 1946. He was a member of the public relations staff of Owens-Corning Fiberglass Corp., in Toledo, Ohio, from 1946 to 1953. He served as director of the Republican National Committee in 1953 and 1954.

Baumhart was again elected as a Republican to the Eighty-fourth, Eighty-fifth, and Eighty-sixth Congresses. He was not a candidate for renomination in 1960. Baumhart voted in favor of the Civil Rights Acts of 1957 and 1960. He was a delegate to 1968 Republican National Convention.

He later worked as public relations consultant.

Death 
He died on January 23, 2001, in Lorain, Ohio. He is interred at Maple Grove Cemetery in Vermilion, Ohio.

References

The Political Graveyard

1908 births
2001 deaths
Republican Party Ohio state senators
Ohio University alumni
United States Navy personnel of World War II
People from Vermilion, Ohio
United States Navy officers
20th-century American politicians
Republican Party members of the United States House of Representatives from Ohio